A shell room may refer to:

Shell grotto – an early modern decorative folly
 The Shell Room at Woburn Abbey in England 
Magazine (artillery)#Naval magazines – a room for military ammunition, especially naval